Wai Chim (born 1984) is a Chinese American author of books for children and young adults residing in Australia. She was a contestant on Australian Survivor: Brains V Brawn, the sixth season of Australian Survivor.

Early life 
Born and raised in New York, Wai spoke Cantonese in her home growing up, and spent time in Japan before relocating to Australia in 2006. Chim graduated from Duke University where she majored in English and Economics.

Writing career 
Wai writes books for children and young adults. In addition to the Chook Chook series, her next book Shaozhen: Through My Eyes is set in rural China, and her third has the “great leap forward” as a backdrop. Shaozhen: Through My Eyes is part of the "Natural Disaster Zones" series which was awarded the 2019 Educational Publishing Award, given by the Australian Publishers Association (APA). Her most recent release, The Surprising Power of a Good Dumpling, features a Chinese Australian family, and was finalist for the 2021 Kirkus Prize for Young Readers' Literature. It is also recommended by the New York Times as a "Fantastic, Flavor-Filled Novel for Kids."

Survivor 
Wai appeared as a contestant on the Australian reality television show, Australian Survivor: Brains V Brawn. She made it far into the competition and placed fifth overall voted out on day 44 of 48 days.

Publications 

 The Chook Chook Series, University of Queensland Press
 Chook Chook: Mei's Secret Pets, 2012, 
 Chook Chook: Little and Lo in the City, 2013, 
 Chook Chook: Saving the Farm, 2014, 
 Shaozhen: Through My Eyes - Natural Disaster Zones, Allen & Unwin, 2017, 
 Freedom Swimmer, Scholastic Press, 2021 (first published 2016), 
 The Surprising Power of a Good Dumpling, 2019 (Allen & Unwin),

References

External links 
 

Living people
Women writers of young adult literature
Australian writers by ethnic or national origin
Australian Survivor contestants
1984 births